Bose is a 2004 Indian Tamil-language action thriller film written and directed by Senthil Kumar. It stars Srikanth and Sneha and Kalabhavan Mani, Nagesh, Thalaivasal Vijay, Manikka Vinayagam, and Kalairani in supporting roles. Upon release, the film was dubbed into Telugu as Rakshana and released in 2005, and the film was also dubbed in Hindi as Commando - The Force. The film was also remade in Kannada as Yodha and released in 2009. Bose follows the path of a soldier after he is fired after an incident where he injures a politician attempting to rape a girl. The politician hires thugs to take him down while the soldier attempts to take down the greedy politician.

Plot
Bose (Srikanth), the eponymous hero, is an Army Special Ops commando. At the time, there occurs a vacancy in the Chief Ministership of Tamil Nadu, and the top two ministers of the incumbent cabinet are called to Delhi for an interview. One of them is Home Minister Kottaiperumal (Kalabhavan Mani) is kidnapped by terrorists, Bose goes on a daring rescue operation and manages to pull it off. Because of this, Kottaiperumal is selected as the next Chief minister over his rival Nallathambi, and selects Bose as his personal security guard. Up close with Kottaiperumal, Bose gets to know his other real side. When Kottaiperumal tries to molest a college girl named Charulatha (Sneha), Bose rises up in anger. In trying to save Charulatha, he ends up shooting Kottaiperumal in his privates. Though Kottaiperumal escapes, he becomes sterile due to his shot and decides to take revenge by getting Bose sacked from the Army. Distraught and disconsolate, Bose lands in Chennai and meets Charulatha, who is a student in Kalashektra. Upon meeting her, the duo falls in love. However, Kottaiperumal is waiting for revenge and has his goons on Bose and Charulatha's track. After some fights, Kottaiperumal's men bump off Bose's father (Manikka Vinayagam) and kidnap his family members and Charulatha. By then, Bose also stumbles upon the links of Kottaiperumal with terrorist outfits (the first kidnapping itself was a stage-managed one to win voters' sympathy), so he goes on a fight to finish. All ends well, and Bose is also reinstated in the Army.

Cast

 Srikanth as Captain Bose, 51 SAG, National Security Guards
 Sneha as Charulatha, Bose's love interest
 Kalabhavan Mani as Union Minister Kottaiperumal
 Manikka Vinayagam as Bose's father
 Kalairani as Bose's mother
 Thalaivasal Vijay as Bose's brother
 Nagesh as Bose's grandfather
 Brinda Das as Bose's sister-in-law
 Devan as Col. Sharma, Commanding Officer, 51 SAG
 M. S. Baskar as Vedimuthu
 Ponnambalam as Sivamani
 Shanmugarajan
 Chitra Lakshmanan
 Manobala
 Jasper
 Mahanadi Shankar
 Muthukaalai

Production
This was the third and last time that Srikanth and Sneha were teamed up - after the successes of April Maadhathil (2002) and Parthiban Kanavu (2003).

Some action scenes were picturised on Srikanth, Jasper, and some stuntmen at a factory in Ennore. It took eight days to shoot the scene involving 23 stunt artistes. It was choreographed by stunt master Peter Hein. Srikanth, for the role of a commando, had trained under Major Ravi, who supervised the army scenes. Some of the locations for the film are Chennai, Thalakulam, Bangalore, Delhi, and Kerala. Two of the songs have been picturised in Russia.

Soundtrack

The soundtrack was composed by Yuvan Shankar Raja, while his elder brother Karthik Raja composed the film's background score. The audio CD containing songs released on 9 August 2004. It features five songs with lyrics written by Pa. Vijay, Na. Muthukumar, Thamarai and Snehan.

Release
Bose did not make it to the screens as scheduled on October 9 (Saturday) due to the last minute financial dispute. The prints left the lab on Sunday morning and made it to the screens in southern districts of Madurai and beyond only for the matinee show. In Chennai and surrounding areas, the film opened with noon shows on Sunday. Nearly 5 lakh worth of advertisement was spent for the opening weekend. Trade lost almost 40 lakh due to missed opening.

Reviews
Indiaglitz wrote:"Director Senthilkumar manages to hold your interest for most part. But lets slip his guard towards the end and the climax peters on predictability". Bizhat wrote:"The film is an action entertainer without any sluggishness". Sify wrote:"story is pure balderdash. Perhaps to compensate for the lack of a coherent script, the director tries to pack in as much commercial elements like songs, crass comedy and lots of action into the storyline. The first half is crisp while the latter half drags a bit. Still the high-octane action drama is watchable". Behindwoods wrote:"The first half of the movie is good, and takes phase with decent action, but the story line sags in the second half of the movie, as unnecessary violence is let loose on the goon squad". Hindu wrote:"The first half just whizzes past. It is the second half that stretches a little and also has scenes ending rather abruptly".

References

External links
 

2004 films
Tamil films remade in other languages
Indian action thriller films
2000s Tamil-language films
2004 action thriller films